The northern white-breasted hedgehog (Erinaceus roumanicus) is a species of hedgehog.

Distribution
The range of the species extends in the west as far as Poland, Austria and the former Yugoslavia, and south to Greece and the Adriatic Islands, including populations on Crete, Corfu and Rhodes. It is found eastwards through Russia and Ukraine, as far east as the Ob River in Siberia. It is widespread throughout this range, and there are no signs of a significant population decline.

Taxonomy
Taxonomically, it was for a time considered to be a subspecies of E. europaeus, and later a subspecies of E. concolor. Since the 1990s, it has been considered a separate species in its own right, following new genetic and morphological studies, with five subspecies - E. roumanicus roumanicus, E. roumanicus bolkayi, E. roumanicus drozdovskii, E. roumanicus nesiotes, and E. roumanicus pallidus.

Variation
In Europe, the size of the northern white-breasted hedgehog (Erinaceus roumanicus) in southern Europe was greater in comparison to white-breasted hedgehog in northern Europe. The size of the northern white-breasted hedgehog varied based on the temperature and precipitation, the size of the white-breasted hedgehog was larger in higher temperatures. The higher the precipitation, specifically summer precipitation, the smaller the size of the white-breasted hedgehog.(Kryštufek et al.,2009)

Parasites
The species is a common synanthrope and is known to carry not only the hedgehog tick, Ixodes hexagonus, but also Ixodes ricinus, the most common European tick species. They are known also to host zoonotic Bartonellae species. A large-scale molecular investigation of fleas was performed to the white-breasted hedgehog due to them being a geographically widespread species and being a very urbanized species. The widespreadness and urbanization of the species gives the white-breasted hedgehog a chance to spread their fleas, specifically Archaeopsylla erinacei, to cats and dogs, which could lead to spread to humans (Gilles et al. 2008). In the investigation, all fleas were positive for rickettsiae (Hornok et al., 2014).In this investigation, 759 fleas were studied, there was detection of Rickettsia helvetica (1.5%),Bartonella henselae (0.7%), hemoplasmas of the hemofelis group (5.2%), and rickettsia genotype were identified (10%)(Hornok et al., 2014).

References

northern white-breasted hedgehog
Mammals of Azerbaijan
Mammals of Europe
Mammals of Russia
northern white-breasted hedgehog
northern white-breasted hedgehog